Voodoocult is the second and last album by heavy metal band Voodoocult, released in 1995.

Release
The album was issued on CD and double vinyl. The double vinyl edition with limited circulation of 1.000 and the Japanese edition contained two bonus tracks. The track "Death of a Kung Fu fighter" from the same sessions was not part of the album. However, its lyrics were printed in the booklet and it was released in 1996 on the single When Love Gets Terminated by Phillip Boa & The Voodooclub.

Track listing

Chart positions

Personnel

Voodoocult
 Phillip Boa – vocals
 Gabby Abularach – guitar
 Jim Martin – guitar
 Dave Ball – bass
 Markus Freiwald – drums
 Moses Pellberg – samples

Additional personnel
 Tommy Newton – production, engineering, mastering
 Eric Smith – engineering
 David Vella – pre-production, vocal production
 Wolfgang Scheideler – guitar recording
 Dirk Rudolph – design, photography

References

1995 albums
Voodoocult albums